The Last Judgment is a triptych attributed to Flemish painter Hans Memling and painted between 1467 and 1471. It is now in the National Museum in Gdańsk in Poland. It was commissioned by Angelo Tani, an agent of the Medici at Bruges, but was captured at sea by Paul Beneke, a privateer from Danzig. A lengthy lawsuit against the Hanseatic League demanded its return to Italy. It was placed in the Basilica of the Assumption but in the 20th century it was moved to its present location.

The triptych depicts the Last Judgment during the second coming of Jesus Christ, the central panel showing Jesus sitting in judgment on the world, while St Michael the Archangel is weighing souls and driving the damned towards Hell (the sinner in St. Michael's right-hand scale pan is a donor portrait of Tommaso Portinari); the left hand panel showing the saved being guided into heaven by St Peter and the angels; and the right-hand panel showing the damned being dragged to Hell.

References 

National Museum in Gdańsk's page on the painting

External links

The Last Judgement Triptych
The Last Judgment on BALaT - Belgian Art Links and Tools (KIK-IRPA, Brussels)

Paintings by Hans Memling
1471 paintings
Triptychs
Paintings depicting Jesus
Paintings depicting Michael (archangel)
Paintings of the Virgin Mary
Demons in art
Musical instruments in art